PICAO or Picao may refer to:

Picão, a settlement in the northeastern part of Príncipe Island in São Tomé and Príncipe
David Picão (1923-2009), Brazilian bishop
Provisional International Civil Aviation Organization, which became the International Civil Aviation Organization in 1947.